The Reeve Electric Association Plant, now known as the REA Power Plant Museum, is an historic structure located near Hampton, Iowa, United States.  In the 1930s only 10% of rural homes and farms in the United States had electricity.  The first mention of rural electrification in Hampton came in March 1936.

It was the first farmer-owned power plant in the United States to receive an REA grant in 1937 and in 1938 it was the second to go on-line.  There were four generators powered by diesel engines when the plant was in full production.  In 1988 the building was given to the Franklin County Historical Society.  It opened a rural and electrical museum in the former plant in 1990.  The same year it was listed on the National Register of Historic Places.

References

External links
 Franklin County Historical Society

Industrial buildings completed in 1938
Buildings and structures in Franklin County, Iowa
Industrial buildings and structures on the National Register of Historic Places in Iowa
Museums in Franklin County, Iowa
History museums in Iowa
Science museums in Iowa
National Register of Historic Places in Franklin County, Iowa